Sal Sunseri (born August 1, 1959) is an American college and professional football coach who is the special assistant to the head coach and was previously the outside linebackers coach for the Alabama Crimson Tide of the Southeastern Conference (SEC). Sunseri played college football for the University of Pittsburgh, where he was an All-American linebacker. Sunseri produced at least one Pro Bowl player in four of five seasons as NFL defensive line coach, highlighted by Julius Peppers's three consecutive trips to Hawaii from 2004-2006.

Playing career 
Sunseri attended the University of Pittsburgh, where he played for the Pittsburgh Panthers football team from 1978 to 1981.  After beginning his career as a walk-on, Sunseri was a three-year starter and anchored a defense that led the NCAA in total defense in both 1980 and 1981.  During his senior year, he was named a team captain and a consensus first-team All-American.

After graduating, he was selected by the Pittsburgh Steelers in the 1982 NFL Draft; however, he suffered a career ending knee injury during training camp and was given an injury settlement and released from the team.

Coaching career 
Between 1985 and 1992, Sunseri worked as a defensive line and linebacker's coach for his alma mater, the University of Pittsburgh. After Paul Hackett was fired as the team's head coach during Pittsburgh's 1992 season, Sunseri was promoted as an interim head coach for the final game versus Hawaiʻi—a 36–23 loss for the Panthers.

After having previously worked as the defensive line coach for the NFL's Carolina Panthers for six seasons, Sunseri returned to college football on January 21, 2009, when he was named as the outside linebackers coach for the Alabama Crimson Tide football team.  Sunseri was a 2011 finalist for the Broyles Award, given annually to the nation's top college football assistant coach.

In December 2012, Sunseri accepted a job as a defensive assistant at Florida State University.  Sunseri helped coach Florida State to the 2013 BCS National Championship.

In January 2015, Sunseri accepted the position of linebackers coach with the Oakland Raiders.

After one season serving as the Defensive line coach for the Florida Gators, Sunseri accepted an undisclosed position with the Alabama Crimson Tide.

Personal life 
Sunseri is married to Roxann Sunseri (née Evans), who is a former varsity gymnast at Pittsburgh. The couple has two daughters and two sons. His son, Tino played quarterback for the Saskatchewan Roughriders of the CFL. His younger son, Vinnie, played safety for the San Francisco 49ers.

Head coaching record

References

External links
 Alabama Crimson Tide bio

1959 births
Living people
Alabama A&M Bulldogs football coaches
Alabama Crimson Tide football coaches
All-American college football players
American football linebackers
Carolina Panthers coaches
Florida State Seminoles football coaches
Illinois State Redbirds football coaches
Iowa Wesleyan Tigers football coaches
Louisville Cardinals football coaches
LSU Tigers football coaches
Michigan State Spartans football coaches
Oakland Raiders coaches
Pittsburgh Panthers football coaches
Pittsburgh Panthers football players
Tennessee Volunteers football coaches
Sportspeople from Pittsburgh
Coaches of American football from Pennsylvania
Players of American football from Pittsburgh
Pittsburgh Steelers players
Central Catholic High School (Pittsburgh) alumni